Tasia Marie Scolinos (born May 8, 1972), a United States lawyer and a political appointee under the administration of George W. Bush.

Personal
Scolinos is a native of Arcadia, California.

Education
Scolinos graduated from Claremont McKenna College and the Georgetown Law School.

Scolinos practiced law in California from 2000 to 2001.

Career

2001-2002
From 2001–2002, Scolinos worked as a spokesperson for the Treasury Department in which she supervised all issues in the Department's law enforcement portfolio. Her efforts also were focused on freezing terrorist assets and enforce the Cuba embargo.

In 2002, Scolinos served as a member of the Department's transition team until she was appointed when the Department was formally established.

2003
In 2003, she became the Deputy Assistant Secretary for Public Affairs and Senior Director of Communications for the U.S. Department of Homeland Security in which she managed the Department's communications staff, press office, speechwriting unit, web development and public liaison office.

2005
In 2005, she became the Director of Public Affairs for the U.S. Department of Justice.

External links
The Department of Justice Bio

References

1972 births
Living people
American people of Greek descent
California lawyers
Georgetown University Law Center alumni
Women in California politics
United States Department of Homeland Security officials
People from Arcadia, California
21st-century American women